The United States Women's Polo Federation (USWPF) formerly coordinated the activities of its United States member teams, arranging and supervising women's professional polo matches and tournaments. It has now been merged with the United States Polo Association.

External links
 USWPF website

Women's polo
Polo governing bodies
Polo in the United States